The Birmingham Book Club, known to its opponents during the 1790s as the Jacobin Club due to its political radicalism, and at times also as the Twelve Apostles, was a book club and debating society based in Birmingham, England from the 18th to the 20th century. During the 18th century Midlands Enlightenment, the Radical and Unitarian allegiance of its members give it a national significance.

Little is known of the club's origins, but surviving records suggest that it was in existence by 1745. The club met at Freeth's Coffee House at the Leicester Arms on the corner of Bell Street and Lease Lane in Birmingham from at least 1758. John Freeth announced club dinners to its members with rhyming invitations. 24 members were listed in 1775. Liberal and radical, as much concerned with politics as with books, the club formed a focus for local support for John Wilkes between 1768 and 1774, and for opposition to the Ministry of Lord North during the 1770s and 1780s.

The society held an annual sale of its books, and its members provided the nucleus of subscribers to the Birmingham Library which was founded in 1779.

The club was still in existence, with twelve members, in 1964.

References

Bibliography

Debating societies
Literary societies
History of Birmingham, West Midlands
Clubs and societies in the West Midlands (county)